Antonio de la Cruz, O.F.M. (1480–1550) was a Roman Catholic prelate who served as Bishop of Islas Canarias (1545–1550).

Biography
Antonio de la Cruz was born in Burgos, Spain in 1480 and ordained a priest in the Order of Friars Minor.
On 7 Dec 1545, he was appointed during the papacy of Pope Paul III as Bishop of Islas Canarias.
On 4 Jan 1546, he was consecrated bishop. 
He served as Bishop of Islas Canarias until his death in 1550 in Cadiz.

See also
Roman Catholicism in Spain

References

External links and additional sources
 (for Chronology of Bishops)
 (for Chronology of Bishops)

16th-century Roman Catholic bishops in Spain
Bishops appointed by Pope Paul III
1480 births
1550 deaths
Franciscan bishops